Tonstad Power Station  (Tonstad kraftverk) is a hydroelectric power station located in the municipality of Sirdal in Agder county, Norway. The station is in Tonstad, at the northern end of the lake Sirdalsvatnet.

It has a total installed capacity of 960 MW, with 4 units each 160 MW and one unit at 320 MW, all equipped with francis turbines. With an annual production of approximately 3800 GWh, it is the largest power station in Norway with respect to annual production (in 2006). It is near the landing point of the 1,400 MW NORD.LINK power cable to Germany.

An application for an expansion with an additional 960 MW (pumped storage) was sent in 2008. The application is still pending.

See also

References

Hydroelectric power stations in Norway
Buildings and structures in Agder
Dams in Norway